İlyas Şükrüoğlu (born 1966) is a Turkish Olympic wrestler competing in the light flyweight (-48 kg) division. He holds two European silver medals and one gold medal at the Mediterranean Games. He was born as an ethnic Turk in Bulgaria, and emigrated to Turkey.

Early life
İlyas Şükrüoğlu was born to an ethnic Turkish family in Kardzhali, Bulgaria in 1966. He started wrestling in 1975. He defected and emigrated to Turkey after he escaped from the Bulgarian national wrestling team during a trip in Canada for international competitions. Currently, he lives in Bursa, Turkey.

Career
He competed for Turkey in the men's freestyle 48 kg at the 1988 Summer Olympics in Seoul, South Korea, where he placed sixth. He competed at the World Wrestling Championships in 1989 in Switzerland, 1990 in Japan and 1993 in  Canada placing 4th, 10th and 4th respectively. He became the silver medalist of the 1989 European Wrestling Championships in Ankara and 1993 European Wrestling Championships in Istanbul, Turkey. He placed fifth at the 1991 European Championships in Stuttgart, Germany. He won the gold medal at the 1991 Mediterranean Games held in Athens, Greece.

After his retirement, he served as a coach in the 2000s.

References

External links
 

Living people
1966 births
People from Kardzhali
Bulgarian emigrants to Turkey
Bulgarian Turks in Turkey
Turkish male sport wrestlers
Olympic wrestlers of Turkey
Wrestlers at the 1988 Summer Olympics
Mediterranean Games medalists in wrestling
Mediterranean Games gold medalists for Turkey
European Wrestling Championships medalists
Competitors at the 1991 Mediterranean Games